Schleich is a German producer of handpainted toy figurines and accessories. The company is headquartered in Germany. The traditional market for Schleich products is Mainland Europe, with half their sales in Germany. The toys are sold worldwide and are quite popular in the United Kingdom, France, Australia and North America

History
Schleich was founded by Friedrich Schleich in 1935. Its figurines were first released in the 1950s with the development, production and marketing of comic figurines such as Snoopy and the Smurfs. In the early 1980s they added animal figurines and Muppet characters to their range of products. Until the end of 2006, Schleich was a family-owned business. It was then taken over by the British investment company HgCapital, who paid 165 million euro for an 80% share.

Design, production and materials
The design of products and the creation of tooling is mostly in-house. Production is at the German headquarters and in production facilities in foreign countries, with the figures being hand-painted in China, Germany, Spain, Portugal, Tunisia, Bosnia, and Romania. In 2006, Schleich had about 250 employees and a yearly sales figure of around 80 million Euro.  

Schleich toys are made of polyvinyl chloride, PVC, commonly used in the construction industry for plumbing water lines in homes and businesses. They also add a softener developed by BASF called Hexamoll® DINCH®. This softener is not only used in toys but also for food packaging and for use in the medical field for blood product packaging and breathing tubes. 

Production modeling can take as little as 2 weeks for a simple dog.  A horse will typically take 3 weeks and dinosaurs can take up to 8 full weeks to model.

Product lines
The current line of figurines now includes six major brands owned by Schleich:

 Wildlife|Wild Life
 Farm World
 Horse Club
 Dinosaurs
 Bayala
 Eldrador Creatures

They also have a licensing agreement to produce smurfs. In the past, Schleich has licensed brands including Marvel, DC, Disney and Peanuts.

The first major success for Schleich was JOPO, which were bendy figures with long legs. From there, they met success with their first launch of smurf figures. Since then, they have worked with a variety of brands to bring characters to life. But Schleich's overall success today is a result of its animal figures.

Schleich flagship stores
After a pop-up store in Charlotte, North Carolina proved popular in 2018, Schleich began partnerships with major toy retailers in various locations in the United States in 2019, creating in-store Schleich flagship stores. The first of these were in Beverly Hills and San Mateo, California, and Kingston, Massachusetts. Maziply Toys in Kingston, MA is the oldest flagship store in the United States.

Headquarters
Schleich is headquartered in Schwäbisch Gmünd, Germany.

Notes

External links

Companies based in Baden-Württemberg
Manufacturing companies established in 1935
German brands
Toy companies of Germany
Figurine manufacturers
Toy companies established in 1935
German companies established in 1935